Polyanski, also transliterated as Polyanskiy or Polyansky, is a Russian surname (the female form being Polyanskaya). People with this surname include:

 Pavel Lebedev-Polianskii (1888–1948), Russian Bolshevik writer
 Dmitry Polyansky (1917–2001), former Deputy Premier of the Soviet Union 
 Anatoly Polyansky (1928–1993), Russian architect
 Valery Polyansky (born 1949), a Russian choral and orchestral conductor
 Igor Nikolaevich Polyansky (born 1967), Russian swimmer, living in New Zealand
 Dmitry Polyanski (born 1986), Russian triathlete, husband of Anastasiya Polyanskaya
 Anastasiya Polyanskaya (born 1989), Ukrainian triathlete, wife of Dmitry Polyanski
 Lyubov Polyanskaya (born 1989), Russian triathlete
 Igor Andreyevich Polyanski (born 1990), Russian triathlete, the younger brother of Dmitry Polyanski
 Stepan Polyansky

Surnames of Russian origin